Insomniac is the eighth studio album, and fourth English-language album, released by Spanish singer Enrique Iglesias. The album is the first English release of Iglesias in 4 years since that of his seventh studio album 7 (2003) deemed a commercial failure. Insomniac has an edgier, darker, more urban and contemporary sound compared to its predecessor, as it contains Iglesias's first collaboration with a rapper, Lil Wayne on the song "Push" as well as a cover of indie rock band Ringside's "Tired of Being Sorry". It was released worldwide on 11 June 2007 and in the USA on 12 June 2007.

Background and composition 

The album is his first for four years since 7. "Insomniac" is not just the title of the album, it is also a fact of Iglesias' life, who says he often takes sleeping pills to get a good night's rest. Iglesias recorded most of the album in the evening and early hours of the morning. He wrote more than 50 songs before settling on 12 that he felt were strong enough to put on the album.

Insomniac is said to be Iglesias' most diverse to date. It features a song titled "Miss You", which he has dedicated to his girlfriend, former tennis star Anna Kournikova, as well as a track, "Push", which he performs with rapper Lil' Wayne—a big departure from his usual material. The first single, "Do You Know", has become known as the "ping pong song" because of its stand-out beat. There is also a cover of indie pop band Ringside's "Tired of Being Sorry".

Critical reception

Allmusic reviewer Stephen Thomas Erlewine gave to the album 2.5 out of 5 stars, writing: "'Insomniac' is pushed to a younger audience. But Enrique is too much of a crossover guy to spend the entire album doing the nasty. Sometimes, he pushes too hard in either direction, but sometimes Iglesias strikes the right balance between crossover pop and stylish retro-new wave production. What works on this slick, snazzy makeover is what always works for him: the ballads and the middle-of-the-road pop tunes. They may not be hip, but they're part of the family tradition, and when he sticks to them, he's as good as ever." Lauren Murphy from Entertainment.ie criticized the songs, writing: "Every track here is either a sombre, mumbled, slow-moving number that sounds dated and cumbersome, cheesy radio-friendly dirges that have been done a million times before and better or are just so amateur-sounding that they're embarrassing." Jonathan Bernstein from Entertainment Weekly wrote "Insomniac sees Iglesias possessed by the vengeful spirit of Toad the Wet Sprocket ("Stay Here Tonight"), outshone by Lil Wayne on the plodding club banger Push, and, yes, upstaged by a sampled Ping-Pong ball on Do You Know? (The Ping Pong Song)."

Jerome Blakeney from BBC Music gave to the album a positive review, stating that "He remains the king of latin-tinged heart-tugging and at least half of this album keeps him firmly on top." Joey Guerra from Houston Chronicle also gave to the album a positive review, writing: "Insomniac's secret weapons, however, are its ballads, which cast Iglesias as – of course – a sensitive, soulful Spanish lover." Scott Shelter wrote for Slant Magazine that "The ballads are disappointing because the rest of Insomniac isn't half bad, and if all of the ballads were like the acoustic 'Don't You Forget About Me", Insomniac would've been worthwhile effort; instead, it's a case study in ironic album titles."

Commercial performance 
The album debuted at number 17 on the Billboard 200 chart, with 45,000 copies sold. However, the previous album, 2003's 7, began at number 31, but with 77,000 copies. It entered the UK charts at number 3 and went on to be certified Gold. The album went Platinum (or multiplatinum) in countries such as Ireland, Russia and Poland.

Track listing 
Credits adapted from the liner notes of Insomniac.

Notes
 signifies a vocal producer
 signifies a remixer
 signifies a co-producer
 signifies an additional producer

Charts

Weekly

Year-end

Certifications and sales

Release history

References

2007 albums
Enrique Iglesias albums
Albums produced by John Shanks
Albums produced by Sean Garrett
Albums produced by Stargate
Albums produced by Mark Taylor (music producer)